Jack Herman is an American game designer who has worked primarily on role-playing games.

Career
In the late 1970s, Jack Herman and Jeff Dee co-created Villains and Vigilantes, the first complete superhero role-playing game. The game was published by Fantasy Games Unlimited in 1979. Dee and Herman convinced Scott Bizar to produce a second edition, which was published in 1982.

When Bizar began publishing a number of original PDFs for  Villains and Vigilantes for free through his website in 2010, Dee and Herman contended that they had contracted with FGU Inc., not Bizar, and that this means that Bizar no longer had the rights to publish V&V. The two sent Bizar a cease-and-desist letter in June 2010, instructing him that he was no longer allowed to sell their games. As of early 2011, Bizar had refused a license that would give him the right to continue publishing Villains & Vigilantes material and had also refused arbitration with Dee and Herman, although Dee and Herman have stated it is required by their contract.

Dee and Herman published version 2.1 of Villains & Vigilantes (2010) under their new brand, Monkey House Games, founded to recover Villains and Vigilantes, and the company is a partner of Cubicle 7.

References

External links
 Jack Herman at Pen & Paper RPG Database [archived]

Living people
Role-playing game designers
Year of birth missing (living people)